Events from the year 1983 in China.

Incumbents 
 General Secretary of the Chinese Communist Party - Hu Yaobang
 Chairman of the National Congress – Ye Jianying (head of state, until June 18)
 President – Li Xiannian (starting June 18)
 Premier – Zhao Ziyang 
 Chairman of the Chinese People's Political Consultative Conference – Deng Xiaoping (until June), Deng Yingchao (starting June)
 Vice President – Ulanhu (starting 18 June)
 First Vice Premier – Wan Li

Governors  
 Governor of Anhui Province – Zhou Zijian then Wang Yuzhao 
 Governor of Fujian Province – Ma Xingyuan then Hu Ping 
 Governor of Gansu Province – Li Dengying then Chen Guangyi
 Governor of Guangdong Province – Liu Tianfu then Liang Lingguang 
 Governor of Guizhou Province – Su Gang then Wang Zhaowen
 Governor of Hebei Province – Liu Bingyan then Zhang Shuguang 
 Governor of Heilongjiang Province – Chen Lei 
 Governor of Henan Province – Yu Mingtao (acting) then He Zhukang 
 Governor of Hubei Province – Han Ningfu then Huang Zhizhen 
 Governor of Hunan Province – Sun Guozhi then Liu Zheng 
 Governor of Jiangsu Province – Han Peixin then Gu Xiulian 
 Governor of Jiangxi Province – Zhao Zengyi  
 Governor of Jilin Province – Zhang Gensheng then Zhao Xiu 
 Governor of Liaoning Province – Quan Shuren (starting April)
 Governor of Qinghai Province – Huang Jingbo  
 Governor of Shaanxi Province – Yu Mingtao (until April), Li Qingwei (starting April)
 Governor of Shandong Province – Liang Buting 
 Governor of Shanxi Province – Luo Guibo then Wang Senhao 
 Governor of Sichuan Province – Lu Dadong (until April)/Yang Xizong
 Governor of Yunnan Province – Liu Minghui (until April), Pu Chaozhu (starting April)
 Governor of Zhejiang Province – Li Fengping then Xue Ju

Events 

 Anti-Spiritual Pollution Campaign
 Hu Na Diplomatic incident
 1983 Guilin Airport collision
 Weightlifting at the 1983 National Games of China
 1983 Guangdong–Hong Kong Cup
 3rd Golden Rooster Awards
 6th National People's Congress began
 Outlaws of the Marsh (TV series) debuted
 CCTV New Year's Gala debuted

Births 
 April 5 – Zhong Jinyu
 May 15 – Yang Jinghui
 July 17 – Joker Xue, singer-songwriter
 July 23 – Jiao Fengbo
 November 6 – Bao Yingying
 November 9 – Wang Qingyun

Deaths 

 Wang Guosong
 Liang Zongdai
 Xiao San
 Sun Fucheng
 Alexander Fu Sheng

See also 
 1983 in Chinese film

References